Ade Suhendra (born 7 May 1983) is an Indonesian former footballer who last played as a central midfielder for Dewa United.

Honours

Club
Sriwijaya
 Indonesian Community Shield: 2010
 Indonesian Inter Island Cup: 2010
Dewa United
 Liga 2 third place (play-offs): 2021

References

External links
 

1983 births
Association football midfielders
Living people
Indonesian footballers
Liga 1 (Indonesia) players
Persija Jakarta players
PSPS Pekanbaru players
Sriwijaya F.C. players
Sportspeople from Riau